Chunky Monkey can refer to:

A flavor of Ben and Jerry's ice cream consisting of banana ice cream with fudge chunks & walnuts
Chunky Monkey, a 2001 British film
 In American slang, an overweight person.
 Chunky Monkey, an amusement park in Karachi, Pakistan